Varsity Field is a baseball field located on the campus of the University at Albany in Albany, New York, United States.  The field is home to the  team of the NCAA Division I America East Conference. The facility shares its name with the university's soccer facility. The field hosted the school's inaugural Division I baseball game on March 24, 2000, in which the Great Danes defeated the Canisius Golden Griffins 9–1.

Renovations
The field underwent renovations prior to the 2004 season.  Improvements included a new fence, new foul poles, bullpens, and batting cages.  A new scoreboard was also added following the 2004 season.

See also
 List of NCAA Division I baseball venues

References

External links
 Varsity Field

College baseball venues in the United States
Baseball venues in New York (state)
Sports venues in Albany, New York
Albany Great Danes baseball